Hasan Irlu (1959December20, 2021) was an Iranian diplomat. He served as the Iranian ambassador to Houthi-controlled Yemen from 2020 to 2021. He was a former member of the Islamic Revolutionary Guard Corp’s (IRGC) Quds Force, who became the head of its Yemen operations in Iran at the request of Qassem Soleimani.

Early life
Hassan Irlu was born in the city of Ray, in Tehran Province, where he completed his primary studies in Tehran in the Dolab Gate area, then completed his undergraduate studies at the University of the Ministry of Foreign Affairs in the Department of International Relations to obtain a doctorate and start his work with the Ministry of Foreign Affairs.

Move to Yemen
On October 17, 2020, Iran posted Irlu as its ambassador in Sanaa. On December 8, 2020, the United States placed Hassan Irlu under terrorism-related sanctions under Executive Order 13224.

COVID-19 infection and death
On December 21, 2021, the Iranian Ministry of Foreign Affairs announced that its envoy to the Houthi militia had died after he returned to the country at the end of last week in poor health after contracting COVID-19. The ministry said in a statement issued by the Islamic Republic News Agency (IRNA), that the Iranian ambassador to the National Salvation Government in Yemen, Hasan Irlu, died of infection with the coronavirus, despite medical follow-up. Irlu had been evacuated from Sanaa three days earlier on an Iraqi medical evacuation plane. Official Iranian obituaries said that Hasan Irlu was one of the leaders of the resistance and was a courageous leader, describing him as a martyr who was martyred while performing his mission. Saeed Khatibzadeh, the spokesman for the Ministry of Foreign Affairs of Iran, was quoted as describing Irlu as a "martyr" and a "chemical warfare veteran" of the Iran-Iraq war and contracted the coronavirus at the embassy and died at dawn after returning in unfavorable conditions. The deputy commander of the IRGC, Ali Fadavi, also named him as a "fighter in the resistance front" accused the United States and its allies of delaying Irlu's evacuation from Sanaa. He had been suffering from respiratory problems because of his exposure to chemical weapons when he was fighting in the Iran-Iraq war.

Attributing him to Abdolreza Shahlai
IRNA wrote in a report that it later removed from its website that Irlu was the same individual as Abdulreza Shahlai. However, the US State Department confirmed that they were two different people and the reward for the arrest of Abdulreza Shahlai still stands.

References

1959 births
2021 deaths
21st-century Iranian military personnel
Ambassadors of Iran to Yemen
COVID-19 pandemic in Yemen
Deaths from the COVID-19 pandemic in Iran
Individuals designated as terrorists by the United States government
Iranian individuals subject to the U.S. Department of the Treasury sanctions
Islamic Revolutionary Guard Corps personnel of the Iran–Iraq War
People from Ray, Iran
Quds Force personnel
21st-century Iranian diplomats